David Warren (born October 14, 1978) is a former collegiate American football player from Tyler, Texas.

High school career 
As a sophomore in 1994, he played for the John Tyler High School Lions team under coach Allen Wilson, which went 16–0 and won the 5A Division II state championship in Texas.  The championship run included a legendary regional semifinal game between John Tyler High School and Plano East Senior High School, in which he caught one touchdown pass on offense and scored another touchdown on defense on a fumble recovery. For the season, Warren registered 124 tackles and six sacks.

In his junior year, Warren piled up 126 tackles with 18 sacks and four blocked punts.

In 1996 while still attending John Tyler High School, he was named USA Today High School Defensive Player of the Year and the Bobby Dodd National Lineman of the Year by the Touchdown Club of Atlanta. He recorded 106 tackles and 8.5 sacks despite constant double and triple teaming during senior campaign. He also won district in the 200-meter dash while in high school.

Recruited by virtually every school in the nation, Warren decided to play for the Florida State Seminoles under Coach Bobby Bowden.

College career 
In his true freshman season Warren played in 11 of 12 games, appearing as back-up defensive end behind Tony Bryant and on special teams, and recorded 16 tackles (eight solo) on the year. He notched his first collegiate sack in his first game against Maryland, and tallied a season-high five tackles in the win at Duke. In Florida State's 31–14 win in the Sugar Bowl over Ohio State, Warren contributed two tackles.

As a sophomore, Warren moved in the Florida State defensive two-deep and saw playing time as back-up to Roland Seymour. He finished the year with 30 tackles, including five for loss and also added three sacks and a pass breakup. His season-best game came in the win over Southern California with four tackles, one sack, a caused fumble and two pressures.

In his junior year, Warren appeared in every game and started five including the National Championship game. He finished the season with 32 total tackles, 17 solo stops, and two sacks, while tying for the team lead with three fumbles caused and led all defensive linemen with four passes broken up.

Professional career 
Warren went undrafted in the 2001 NFL Draft, but signed as a Free Agent in 2002 with the Indianapolis Colts. He was later released and signed to the Practice Squad by the Oakland Raiders who released him in June 2003. He did not play in any regular season NFL games.

Later in 2003, Warren played briefly in the Canadian Football League for the BC Lions.

Personal 
Warren suffered from neurological problems steming from a baseball incident as a teen, when a baseball caught him squarely between the eyes, knocking him unconscious. Warren had a metal plate screwed into his forehead to reinforce the area.

References

External links 
Florida State Seminoles bio

1978 births
Living people
Florida State Seminoles football players
Sportspeople from Tyler, Texas
Players of American football from Texas
BC Lions players